Goodbody may refer to:

 Goodbody & Co., a United States stockbroker that faced collapse in 1970 and had to merge into Merrill Lynch
 Goodbody Stockbrokers, an Irish stockbroker, based in Dublin
 Manliffe Goodbody, Irish football and tennis player
 Buzz Goodbody, English Theatre Director
 Will Goodbody, Irish journalist
 James Perry Goodbody, Irish politician
 Tim Goodbody, Irish sailor
 Richard Goodbody, British Army Officer, Adjutant-General
 Catherine Williamson (née Goodbody) Irish politician in Britain, Mayor of Canterbury (1939-1941)

 Slim Goodbody, a fictional character